Tara Street is a railway station in central Dublin, Ireland. It is  adjacent to Loopline Bridge on George's Quay.

It mainly services light rail DART trains and longer distance commuter trains.
Commuter services operate to (1) Maynooth and the western suburbs, (2) Balbriggan, Drogheda and Dundalk on the former GNR(I) main line, (3) Gorey and Rosslare Europort and (4) Newbridge, through the Phoenix Park Tunnel.

Description
The station has two through platforms above street level with ticket areas and retail outlets at street level. The platform retaining walls, the stairwells and canopies were originally timber planking but upgraded to include escalators and fibreglass panels in the 1970s and 1980s.

More recent changes have seen new stairwells installed and platforms lengthened to reflect the increasing throughput.
There are proposals to build in the airspace above the station and adjacent property has been acquired for this purpose.

The ticket office is open between 06:00-00:00 AM, Monday to Sunday.

History

The station opened on 1 May 1891.

It is on the 'Loop Line' which was constructed towards the end of the 19th century by the City of Dublin Junction Railway, connecting the Dublin & Kingstown terminus at Westland Row (now Pearse Station) and Amiens St (now Connolly Station) on the Great Northern Railway (Ireland), and linked into the Midland Great Western freight line, thus joining up all the main railways in Dublin.

City Centre Resignalling
The completion of the Irish Rail City Centre re-signalling project has seen an:

 Increase in the number of Northern and Maynooth line suburban trains stopping at Tara street.  
 Trains from Newbridge also serving Tara Street station.

This has been made possible by increasing the ability of the signalling system in the city centre to operate 20 trains per hour in both directions instead of 8.

The project began in March 2015 and was commissioned on 17 July 2016.

Redevelopment
In March 2015, the CIÉ group placed a tender to find a new property development partner for development at Tara Street. The resulting partner, Tanat Ltd, was found in July 2015 and a resulting plan proposed a €130-million development for an office block of 22 levels. In May 2017, Irish property developer Johnny Ronan announced that he would submit plans to Dublin City Council an 88-metre tower which proposed office space, a hotel, bar, and restaurant. The plan was rejected by Dublin City Council in July 2017, a decision upheld by An Bord Pleanála in March 2018.

In April 2019, An Bord Pleanála approved the plans for a 22-storey tower. Construction began in July 2019.

Proposals
In March 2018, the National Transport Authority (Ireland) (NTA) and Transport Infrastructure Ireland (TII) announced the Metrolink underground Metro project preferred routing and stations. This plan proposed an underground metro station underneath Tara Street railway station.

See also
 List of railway stations in Ireland

References

External links
Irish Rail Tara Street station webpage

 
Iarnród Éireann stations in Dublin (city)
Railway stations opened in 1891
1891 establishments in Ireland
Railway stations in the Republic of Ireland opened in the 19th century